Asques is the name of the following communes in France:

 Asques, Gironde, in the Gironde department
 Asques, Tarn-et-Garonne, in the Tarn-et-Garonne department

See also 
 Asque